The 1920 United States Senate special election in Ohio was held on November 2, 1920. Incumbent Republican Senator Warren G. Harding did not run for re-election, opting instead to run for President of the United States. Republican Governor Frank B. Willis defeated William Alexander Julian in the race for the open seat.

Republican primary

Candidates
Walter F. Brown
Macy Walcutt
J. P. Walser
Walter B. Wanamaker
Frank B. Willis, former Governor of Ohio (1915–17)

Results

Democratic primary

Candidates
William Alexander Julian, banker
A. F. O'Neil

Results

General election

Results

See also 
 1920 United States Senate elections

References

1920
Ohio
United States Senate